Suri Seri Begawan Hospital (SSBH), also known as Kuala Belait Hospital, is a government hospital located in Kuala Belait, the primary town of Belait District, Brunei. It is the second largest hospital in the country, which accommodates 183 beds. The hospital provides secondary health care and other various specialties.

The hospital was established in 1972, and has an influx of clinical specialists by 1977. In 2000, the hospital underwent repairs and renovation.

References 

Hospitals in Brunei